Agustina Paula Habif (born 8 March 1992) is an Argentine field hockey player. At the 2014 Champions Trophy she won her first gold medal with the Argentina national team in an international tournament. Agustina also won the 2014–2015 World League and the 2016 Champions Trophy.

References

External links
 
 
 
 

Living people
Las Leonas players
Argentine people of Lebanese descent
Sportspeople of Lebanese descent
Argentine female field hockey players
1992 births
Field hockey players at the 2015 Pan American Games
Olympic field hockey players of Argentina
Pan American Games silver medalists for Argentina
Field hockey players at the 2016 Summer Olympics
Pan American Games medalists in field hockey
Field hockey players from Buenos Aires
South American Games gold medalists for Argentina
South American Games medalists in field hockey
Female field hockey forwards
Female field hockey midfielders
Competitors at the 2014 South American Games
Medalists at the 2015 Pan American Games
20th-century Argentine women
21st-century Argentine women